Alga is a district of Aktobe Region in Kazakhstan. The administrative center of the district is the town of Alga. Population:

History 
Formed in 1933 as Key district. In 1963 it was renamed into Alginsky district.

References

Districts of Kazakhstan
Aktobe Region